Boetie Gaan Border Toe is a 1984 satire film set during the South African Border War. The film was directed by Regardt van den Bergh, and stars Arnold Vosloo, Frank Dankert and Frank Opperman. Production was assisted by the South African Defence Force (SADF).

Plot
Boetie van Tonder, a young Afrikaner, faces conscription into the South African military. Although initially determined to resist national service and defy instruction, he quickly finds comfort in the company of his fellow conscripts as they weather the harshness of basic training and their subsequent deployment to the Angolan border.

Cast
 Arnold Vosloo as Boetie van Tonder
  as Korporaal Botes
 Frank Dankert as Dampies Ball
 Kelsey Middleton as Jenny Ball
  as Elize
 Kerneels Coertzen as Davel
 Pagel Kruger as Mnr. Moerdijk
 William Abdul as James
 Frank Opperman as De Kock
 Blake Toerien as Piet Slabbert
 Christo Loots as Sunshine
 Neels Engelbrecht as Gattie
 Rudi De Jager as Meyer
 Bobbette Fouche as Mev. Moerdijk
 Graham Clarke as Dokter
 Gys de Villiers as Korporaal Smit
  as Politikus
 Jana Cilliers as Lecturer (dosent)
 Gretha Brazelle as Charmaine

Reception

Literary analyst Monica Popescu described Boetie Gaan Border Toe and its sequel, Boetie Op Manoeuvres, as works which essentially romanticised the South African Border War and devoted a disproportionate amount of emphasis to the "chivalrous conduct of SADF soldiers". Keyan Tomaselli of the University of Johannesburg criticised the film as "propagandistic".

Boetie Gaan Border Toe was a financial success, breaking South African box office records.

References

External links

1984 films
Afrikaans-language films
Films set in the 1980s
South African Border War films
Films set in Namibia
Films set in Angola
South African satirical films
Films directed by Regardt van den Bergh
Apartheid films